Råberg is a Swedish surname that may refer to
Bruno Råberg (born 1954), Swedish-born jazz bassist, composer and music professor 
Einar Råberg (1890–1957), Swedish fencer and wrestler

See also
Råbjerg Mile, a migrating coastal dune in Denmark

Swedish-language surnames